Carluccio is an Italian surname. Notable people with the surname include:

Angela Carluccio (born 1972), Italian politician
Antonio Carluccio (1937–2017), Italian chef, restaurateur and food expert
Jarrod Carluccio, (born 2001), Australian professional footballer 
John Carluccio, American film director

See also
Carluccio (disambiguation)
Carlucci

Italian-language surnames
Patronymic surnames